Edward Kenelm Digby, 11th Baron Digby,  (1 August 1894 – 29 January 1964), also 5th Baron Digby in the Peerage of Great Britain, was a British peer, soldier and politician.

Early life
Digby was the son of Edward Henry Trafalgar Digby, 10th Baron Digby, and Emily Beryl Sissy Hood, daughter of the Hon. Arthur Hood. Admiral Sir Henry Digby was his great-grandfather, while on his mother's side he was a descendant of another naval commander, Admiral Samuel Hood, 1st Viscount Hood.

Career
He succeeded his father as eleventh Baron Digby in 1920 and took his seat in the House of Lords. Like his father, Digby was a Colonel in the Coldstream Guards (adjutant of 1st Battalion 1916–18 and acting second-in-command 1918) and was awarded the Distinguished Service Order and the Military Cross and Bar. He was appointed Honorary Colonel of the Dorsetshire Heavy Brigade, Royal Artillery (a position his father had also held) on 8 December 1929 and continued with its successor unit the 421st (Dorset) Coast Regiment in 1947. He also served as Chairman of the Dorset County Council from 1955 to 1964 and as Lord Lieutenant of Dorset between 1952 and 1964. In 1960, he was made a Knight of the Order of the Garter.

Lord Digby was Chairman of the Orchid Committee of the Royal Horticultural Society.

Personal life
In 1919, Lord Digby married the Hon. Constance Pamela Alice Bruce, daughter of Henry Bruce, 2nd Baron Aberdare, and granddaughter of Henry Bruce, 1st Baron Aberdare. Their children include: 
the Hon. Pamela Beryl Digby (1920–1997), who married and divorced Randolph Churchill and later became American Ambassador to France.
the Hon. Constance Sheila Digby (1921–2014), who married Charles Arthur Moore (1909–1989).
Edward Henry Kenelm Digby (1924–2018), who married Dione Sherbrooke, daughter of Rear-Adm. Robert St Vincent Sherbrooke, in 1952.
the Hon. Jacquetta Mary Theresa James (1928–2019), who married David Guthrie-James MP.

Lord Digby died in January 1964, aged 69, and was succeeded in his titles by his son Edward. Lady Digby died on 15 March 1978.

References
Notes

Sources
 Burke's Peerage, Baronetage and Knightage, 100th Edn, London, 1953.
Kidd, Charles, Williamson, David (editors). Debrett's Peerage and Baronetage (1990 edition). New York: St Martin's Press, 1990, 

1894 births
1964 deaths
Knights of the Garter
Lord-Lieutenants of Dorset
Coldstream Guards officers
Companions of the Distinguished Service Order
British Army personnel of World War I
Recipients of the Military Cross
Edward
Edward 11
Edward 11